North Pier is a pier in Blackpool, England.

North Pier may also refer to:
North Pier (Chicago)

See also
North Pier Apartments, a skyscraper in Chicago
North Pier Light (disambiguation)